The Old Kerosene Store is located at Bathers Beach in Fremantle, Western Australia, adjacent to the ruins of the original Fremantle Long Jetty.  It is a single-storey limestone building and forms part of the historic Arthur Head Reserve precinct.

History
The building was constructed in 1884 by Harwood & Son as a dangerous-goods store, for the storage of kerosene. At the time, kerosene was used extensively for street lighting and heating. It is a single-storey limestone building with a hipped iron roof. In 1919 it was used by the state government's Harbour and Light Department as a warehouse and later as a shipwright's shed.

In 1972, the building was saved from demolition and restored as a space for the creative arts. In 1975 it was used by local artist and potter  Joan Campbell MBE as a pottery studio and gallery until her death in 1997.

The site and building were vested in the City of Fremantle in 1982 and restored as part of the Commonwealth-funded Arthur Head Bicentennial Project in 1986–87.

Heritage value
The Old Kerosene Store is classified by the National Trust of Australia (WA) with the following statement of significance: "A good example of an early colonial building and one of the few remaining buildings of its type in WA. Along with the Round House and the Government Stores, the buildings form an interesting group."
The building was given an interim listing on the State Register of Heritage Places by the Heritage Council of Western Australia on 20 November 1992. It is also listed on the City of Fremantle's Municipal Heritage List.

Current use
In 1998 it was leased by the artist Joanna Robertson, founder of the Kidogo Art Institute, who established a popular, multidisciplinary independent art centre there. In 1998 the building was renamed the Kidogo Arthouse. Kidogo is Swahili for "small".
 
In 2010 the City of Fremantle received a Lotterywest grant to undertake conservation and interpretation works at the Old Port precinct, including the former Kerosene Store, prior to the 2011 ISAF Sailing World Championships. During the event, as a result of temporary relaxations to the liquor licensing laws, the Kidogo Arthouse housed a small bar, the Kelp Bar.

Kelp Bar
Since the success of the Kelp Bar during the ISAF Championships the operator of Kidogo Joanna Robertson has been endeavouring to have the bar operating as a permanent fixture of the gallery. One of the major issues in obtaining a license for the premises has been the inclusion of ablution facilities, as of November 2013 the City of Fremantle still declined permission to apply for the installation of toilets facilities within the heritage building, on 13 December 2013 the City of Fremantle granted permission for an occasional liquor license without the requirement for permanent toilets. Kelp Bar re-opened on 20 December 2013 and operated on weekends through to January 2014.

Further reading

References

External links

Landmarks in Perth, Western Australia
Government buildings completed in 1884
Tourist attractions in Perth, Western Australia
Heritage places in Fremantle
State Register of Heritage Places in the City of Fremantle